Ciudad del Rey Don Felipe, also known as Puerto del Hambre (Port Famine), is a historic settlement site at Buena Bay (locally known as Mansa Bay) on the north shore of the Strait of Magellan approximately  south of Punta Arenas in the Región de Magallanes y la Antártica Chilena, Patagonia, Chile.

Puerto Hambre lies halfway between the South Pole and Chile's northern border with Peru.  Since Chile claims its Antarctic territories extending all the way to the South Pole, this point is sometimes considered the geographical center of Chile.  A monument near the site marks this midpoint.

History

After Francis Drake's successful negotiation of the Strait of Magellan to enter the Pacific Ocean, Spain determined to fortify the strait to hinder further piracy on its ships.  Initially two forts commanded by Pedro Sarmiento de Gamboa were planned for Primera Angostura, but that location was discarded because the tide there would aid ships in crossing the narrow passage. A Spanish fleet of 23 ships and almost 3,000 men and settlers sailed from San Lucar de Barrameda on 27 September 1581, but storms destroyed two of the ships and caused the fleet to return to Spain. Two months later Sarmiento sailed again with 16 ships and 2,200 men. Diego Flores, Sarmiento's second in command, was separated from the main fleet by storms near the eastern entrance of the Strait of Magellan and returned to Spain with 6 ships. 

In March 1584 Sarmiento founded the Spanish settlement of Rey Don Felipe with around 300 settlers.  Conditions were harsh and local vegetation sparse, and the settlers starved or froze to death.  When the next English navigator, Thomas Cavendish, landed at the site in 1587, he found the ruins of the settlement as well as a handful of survivors whom he refused to assist. He removed six cannons from the settlement and renamed the place "Port Famine." In the 19th century, it was developed as a naval base used by the British Royal Navy. The name was subsequently translated into Spanish as Puerto Hambre or Puerto del Hambre, and these names are still in use.

According to archeological finds in the 1970s, the base established by Cavendish was located in the Bahía San Juan, just south of the Bahía San Blas where the Ciudad del Rey Felipe had been.

The Royal Navy hydrographic survey ship HMS Beagle commanded by Captain Pringle Stokes was surveying Patagonia and Tierra del Fuego when Stokes fell into a deep depression. At Port Famine in August 1828, he locked himself in his cabin and shot himself. He was buried in the Cementerio inglés (English cemetery). His grave is still marked on nautical charts.

Command of HMS Beagle was temporarily given to the Beagle's Executive Officer, Lieutenant W.G. Skyring, and then to Flag Lieutenant Robert FitzRoy. FitzRoy became the captain of the Beagle for its second survey expedition, and he took the young naturalist Charles Darwin as a companion on this voyage. They visited Port Famine a number of times between 1832 and 1834 during the expedition.

Chile determined to resettle the site in the 1840s.  On 2 May 1843 the first twenty immigrants, including Bernhard Eunom Philippi, reached the port of Puerto del Hambre. In 1843 Commander John Williams Wilson of the Chilean Navy, also known as Juan Guillermos, built Fuerte Bulnes approximately  further south at the Peninsula known as  Punta Santa Ana (Santa Ana Point). The fort bolstered Chile's claim to the Strait and the Patagonian lands.

In February 1968 the ruins of Puerto del Hambre were made a National Monument. Fuerte Bulnes, which had been abandoned in the 19th century, was reconstructed from 1941 to 1943. In 1968 it was also designated as a National Monument.

See also
 Allen Francis Gardiner

References

External links
Fuerte Bulnes Y Puerto del Hambre, Alrededores de Punta Arenas - Chile
Chile Arica Desert to Tierra del Fuego, RCC Pilotage Foundation.
Puerto Hambre Biologie.de German language wiki page, source of illustrations.
An article in La Tercera about Gamboa and his colonies

Sources 
  Francisco Solano Asta-Buruaga y Cienfuegos, Diccionario geográfico de la República de Chile, Nueva York: D. Appleton y Compania,, 1899, pg. 582 Puerto del Hambre

 

Populated places in Magallanes Province
Archaeological sites in Chile
Populated places established in 1584
Ghost towns in South America
Former populated places in Chile
Strait of Magellan
National Monuments of Chile
1584 establishments in the Captaincy General of Chile
Brunswick Peninsula